We Ate the Children Last is a 2011 Canadian satirical science fiction short film directed by Andrew Cividino based upon a short story by Yann Martel. The film documents the radical societal shifts that occur after pig organ transplants for humans become commonplace.

The film premiered at the 2011 Toronto International Film Festival, and was named to the festival's annual year-end Canada's Top Ten list.

Plot 
A man dying from intestinal cancer volunteers for an experimental treatment which involves receiving the transplanted digestive system of a pig. The transplant is successful, but leaves him with a pig-like penchant for consuming garbage. Considering this an acceptable trade-off for a medical breakthrough, society initially accepts the widespread adoption of the technique, but eventually collapses as the transplant recipients' insatiable appetites evolve into cannibalism.

Cast 
 Keith Berry as Patient D
 David Disher as Medical Examiner
 Frank Longo as Simon Winfield
 Ryan Ward as Ricky Rodgers
 Kalista Zackhariyas as Reporter/Principal

Production 

Shot in 2010, the film incorporates footage from the 2010 G20 Summit in Toronto.

References

External links
 

2011 films
Canadian comedy short films
Canadian science fiction short films
Canadian satirical films
Films directed by Andrew Cividino
Films based on science fiction short stories
Films about cannibalism
2010s English-language films
2010s Canadian films